Helen Michaluk (Marcinkevich; 15 May 1930 – 16 October 2022) was a prominent figure of the Belarusian diaspora, a long-standing (and the only female) head of the Association of Belarusians in Great Britain.

Life and work 
She went to a Polish and then – Belarusian school. 

In 1947, she settled in the United Kingdom and, two years later, married . She became a member of the Association of Belarusians in Great Britain and the Anglo-Belarusian Society; she was also actively involved with St Cyril of Turaŭ Belarusian school in London and the Belarusian Autocephalous Orthodox Church. 

In 1982, Michaluk became a member of the Rada of the Belarusian Democratic Republic. In 1997 she was elected the chair of the Association of Belarusians in Great Britain – the position she held until 2013.

Michaluk died on 16 October 2022, at the age of 92.

Awards 
In 2019, Michaluk was awarded a Belarusian Democratic Republic 100th Jubilee Medal for her contribution to Belarusian public life in the diaspora.

References 

1930 births
2022 deaths
Members of the Rada of the Belarusian Democratic Republic
British people of Belarusian descent
People from Sharkowshchyna District